The 1992 Chico State Wildcats football team represented California State University, Chico as a member of the Northern California Athletic Conference (NCAC) during the 1992 NCAA Division II football season. Led by fourth-year head coach Gary Hauser, Chico State compiled an overall record of 1–9 with a mark of 0–5 in conference play, placing last out of six teams in the NCAC. The team was outscored by its opponents 353 to 199 for the season. The Wildcats played home games at University Stadium in Chico, California.

Schedule

References

Chico State
Chico State Wildcats football seasons
Chico State Wildcats football